The men's individual competition of the triathlon events at the 2011 Pan American Games was held on October 23 at the API Maritime Terminal in Puerto Vallarta. The defending Pan American Games champion is Andy Potts of the United States.

The race was held over the "international distance" and consisted of  swimming, road bicycling, and  road running.

The winner Reinaldo Colucci of Brazil qualifies to compete in the triathlon competitions at the 2012 Summer Olympics in London, Great Britain.

Schedule
All times are Central Standard Time (UTC-6).

Results

Race
40 competitors from 22 countries are scheduled to compete.

References

Triathlon at the 2011 Pan American Games

pt:Triatlo nos Jogos Pan-Americanos de 2011 - Feminino